
Będzin County is a unit of territorial administration and local government (powiat) in Silesian Voivodeship, southern Poland. It came into being on 1 January 1999 as a result of the Polish local government reforms passed in 1998.

The town of Sławków, which became part of Będzin County in 2002 when it was transferred from Lesser Poland Voivodeship to Silesian Voivodeship, forms an exclave. It is separated from the rest of the county by the cities of Dąbrowa Górnicza and Sosnowiec.

As of 2019 its total population is 148,516. The most populated towns are Będzin with 56,624 inhabitants, Czeladź with 31,545 inhabitants and Wojkowice with 8,927 inhabitants.

Neighbouring counties
Będzin County is bordered by Myszków County to the north, Zawiercie County to the north-east, the city of Dąbrowa Górnicza and (through Sławków) Olkusz County to the east, the city of Sosnowiec to the south, the cities of Siemianowice Śląskie and Piekary Śląskie to the west, and Tarnowskie Góry County to the north-west.

Administrative division
The county is subdivided into eight gminas (four urban, one urban-rural and three rural). These are listed in the following table, in descending order of population.

References

 
Land counties of Silesian Voivodeship